Chitinsky District is an administrative district (raion), one of the thirty-one in Zabaykalsky Krai, Russia. It is located in the west of the krai, and borders with Karymsky District in the east, Duldurginsky District in the south, and with Khiloksky District in the west. Its administrative center is the city of Chita. Population (excluding the administrative center):  62,221 (2002 Census);

History
The district was established on September 26, 1937.

Geography
The Yablonoi Mountains and the Chersky Range stretch from NE to SW across the district, one west and the other east of the city of Chita. The mountains are smooth and of moderate height. They are mainly covered by larch taiga. The Arakhley Lake is located west of Chita.

Administrative and municipal status
Within the framework of administrative divisions, Chitinsky District is one of the thirty-one in the krai. The city of Chita serves as its administrative center.

As a municipal division, the territory of the district is split between two municipal formations—Chitinsky Municipal District, to which three urban-type settlements and fifty-four of the administrative district's rural localities belong, and Chita Urban Okrug, which covers the rest of the administrative district's territory, including the city of Chita and the remaining rural locality.

See also
Arakhley

References

Notes

Sources

Districts of Zabaykalsky Krai
States and territories established in 1937